Vae, DeVae or Vaé may refer to the following people:
Vae Kololo, Samoan rugby football player
Magalie Vaé (born Magalie Bonneau in 1987), French singer 
English name of Xu Song (singer), Chinese musician in pop music